Studio Green is an Indian film production and distribution company based in Chennai. The company was founded in 2006 by K. E. Gnanavel Raja, relative of actor Sivakumar and many of their films feature his sons Suriya and Karthi. They have produced several Tamil films and also distributed films across South India.

History
The company first produced and distributed the film Sillunu Oru Kaadhal starring Suriya, in 2006. Next they produced and distributed Paruthiveeran, introducing Karthik Sivakumar, younger brother of Suriya. It ran for more than a year in screens in Tamil Nadu. Following this success, Singam was produced. The Hari directed action film, starring Suriya, also went on to become highly successful at the box office, emerging as one of the highest-grossing Tamil films of that year. Their following production was Naan Mahaan Alla starring Karthi and Kajal Agarwal which also became a commercial success. Their next production was Siruthai starring Karthi and Tamannaah Bhatia, which released on 14 January 2011, coinciding with the Pongal festival and turned out to be another milestone in his career. Simultaneously, they distributed Yamudu, the dubbed Telugu version of Singam and Aawara, that of Paiyaa, in Andhra Pradesh. The former managed to run for 50 days in screens all over the state while Aawara also received good response and ran more than 100 days.

Studio Green distributed the Karthi starrer film, Saguni in 2012. They also started venturing into small scale films in the same year by purchasing and distributing Attakathi and Kumki. Its first production in 2013, Alex Pandian starring Karthi opened to negative reviews while the first distribution Kedi Billa Killadi Ranga was a commercial success. They also distributed Soodhu Kavvum which opened to highly positive critical reaction. The studio produced another film starring Karthi, All in All Azhagu Raja directed by M. Rajesh. The film was released in November and attracted negative reviews. It failed to emulate the success of the director's previous films.

Filmography

Production

Distribution

References

External links
 

Film distributors of India
Film production companies of India
Indian companies established in 2005
Indian film studios
Film production companies based in Chennai
2005 establishments in Tamil Nadu
Mass media companies established in 2005